Aly Ndom (born 30 May 1996) is a French professional footballer who plays as a midfielder for Finnish club IFK Mariehamn.

Career

Reims
Ndom helped Reims win the 2017–18 Ligue 2, helping promote them to the Ligue 1 for the 2018–19 season.

Caen (loan)
He joined Caen on loan in January 2019.

Auxerre
On 29 July 2019, Ndom joined Ligue 2 club Auxerre.

Chindia Târgoviște
On 22 September 2022, Ndom joined Romanian club Chindia Târgoviște.

Viterbese
On 12 January 2023, Ndom signed with Viterbese in the Italian third-tier Serie C. On 1 February 2023, Ndom's contract with Viterbese was terminated after just two bench appearances.

IFK Mariehamn
On 6 February 2023, Ndom signed a one-year contract with IFK Mariehamn in Finland.

Personal life
Born in France, Ndom is of Senegalese descent.

Honours
Reims
 Ligue 2: 2017–18

References

1996 births
Sportspeople from Pontoise
Footballers from Val-d'Oise
French sportspeople of Senegalese descent
Black French sportspeople
Living people
Association football midfielders
French footballers
Stade Malherbe Caen players
Stade de Reims players
AJ Auxerre players
AFC Chindia Târgoviște players
U.S. Viterbese 1908 players
IFK Mariehamn players
Ligue 1 players
Ligue 2 players
Championnat National 2 players
Liga I players
French expatriate footballers
Expatriate footballers in Romania
French expatriate sportspeople in Romania
Expatriate footballers in Italy
French expatriate sportspeople in Italy
Expatriate footballers in Finland
French expatriate sportspeople in Finland